BackPack Travels is a collaborative album by American rapper Buckshot and New Zealand music producer P-Money. It was released on June 24, 2014, via Dawn Raid Entertainment/Dirty Records/Duck Down Music. Production was handled entirely by P-Money, who also served as executive producer together with Buckshot, Andy Murnane, Callum August and Drew "Dru-Ha" Friedman. It features guest appearances from Chelsea Reject, CJ Fly, David Dallas, Joey Bada$$, Raz Fresco, Steele and T'Nah Apex.

The album was supported by three music videos: "Flute", which was directed by Guy Blelloch and released on May 22, 2014, "Sweetest Thing", which was also directed by Blelloch and released on the same day with the album, and "Just Begun", which was released on August 14, 2014. The song "Killuminati" was previously included on P-Money's 2013 album Gratitude.

Track listing

Charts

References

External links 

2014 albums
P-Money albums
Collaborative albums
Duck Down Music albums
Buckshot (rapper) albums
Albums produced by P-Money
Dawn Raid Entertainment albums